Chariton Township is an inactive township in Macon County, in the U.S. state of Missouri.

Chariton Township was named after the Chariton River.

References

Townships in Missouri
Townships in Macon County, Missouri